The Episcopal Diocese of San Diego is the diocese of the Episcopal Church in the United States of America with jurisdiction over San Diego County, Imperial County and part of Riverside County in California plus all of Yuma County in Arizona. It is in Province 8 and encompasses some 50 congregations. It was created in 1973 by splitting off from the Episcopal Diocese of Los Angeles. Its cathedral, St. Paul's Cathedral, is in San Diego. The diocesan offices are located in Ocean Beach at 2083 Sunset Cliffs Blvd., San Diego, CA 92107.

List of bishops
The bishops of San Diego have been:
 Robert M. Wolterstorff, (elected December 7, 1973, consecrated March 30, 1974, retired 1982)
 C. Brinkley Morton, (1982–1992)
 Gethin Benwil Hughes, (1992–2005)
 James Robert Mathes, (2005–2017)
 Katharine Jefferts Schori (Assisting), (2017-2019)
Susan Brown Snook (2019–present)

History
The Episcopal Diocese of San Diego was founded in 1974, over 100 years after the first Episcopal service took place in the region. The area which  makes up the Diocese stretches from Sun City to the Mexican border, from the Pacific Ocean to Yuma, Arizona. Until 1975, it was part of the Episcopal Diocese of Los Angeles.

After Episcopal bishop William Ingraham Kip, a New Englander, was shipwrecked with his wife off the coast of Point Loma, he celebrated his first Eucharist in California at the courthouse in Old Town on Sunday, January 22, 1854.

A separate diocese was formed from the Diocese of Los Angeles and Robert Wolterstorff, formerly rector of St. James by-the-Sea in La Jolla, was consecrated as the first bishop of the Diocese of San Diego in 1974, ending his tenure in 1982. When formed the diocese then had 37 congregations and nearly 20,000 members.

In 1985 St. Paul's was named a cathedral. In 1983, Elizabeth II and her husband Prince Philip, Duke of Edinburgh visited St. Paul's.

The Episcopal Diocese of San Diego today consists of 46 churches and over 20,000 members across San Diego County, Imperial County, southern Riverside County and Yuma County, Arizona. The San Diego diocese is a part of the greater Episcopal Church which has 110 dioceses in 16 nations and is a member province of the worldwide Anglican Communion.

Departures of Members
Since 2003 nine churches experienced the departure of large numbers of their congregation over growing discontent with the theological liberalism of the Episcopal Church. Women's ordination and the ordination of openly gay, partnered bishops have been the lightning rod issues that encouraged these members to leave. Some dissident groups attempted to retain control of their church buildings and property, but in 2008, the California Court of Appeal ruled for the Diocese and upheld the authority of Mathes to dismiss parish vestry members and clergy who sought to take a parish out of The Episcopal Church.

Same-Sex Marriages 
The Episcopal Church provides "wide pastoral latitude" to individual bishops on the subject of blessing same sex couples.  In 2010, Mathes approved a policy by which individual parishes could, after a self study period, choose to recognize LGBT couples in a blessing service.

See also

 List of Succession of Bishops for the Episcopal Church, USA
 St. Dunstan's Episcopal Church (San Diego, California)

References

External links
Episcopal Diocese of San Diego website
St. Paul's Cathedral website
Official Web site of the Episcopal Church

San Diego
Diocese of San Diego
Diocese of San Diego
Churches in San Diego County, California
Christian organizations established in 1974
Province 8 of the Episcopal Church (United States)